Rickshaw Boy or Camel Xiangzi is a 2014 Chinese contemporary classical opera  by Guo Wenjing to a libretto by Xu Ying after Lao She's Rickshaw Boy. It was premiered at the NCPA, China in June 2014. NCPA Classics released both a DVD recording of the opera, and also a separate making-of documentary entitled Xiángzi de yǒngtàn (Xiangzi's chant) in 2017.

References

2014 operas
Chinese western-style operas
Operas
Operas based on novels
Operas by Guo Wenjing
Beijing in fiction